Randall G. Schriver (born 1967) is a former Assistant Secretary of Defense for Indo-Pacific Security Affairs in the United States government. He was nominated by president Donald Trump, confirmed by the Senate on December 20, 2017, and sworn in on January 8, 2018. He resigned on December 12, 2019.

Biography 
Schriver co-founded the Project 2049 Institute in 2008. Various media outlets have described him as a critic of the Chinese government and the Chinese Communist Party as well as a supporter of Taiwan.

On December 12, 2019, it was announced that he would be resigning from his position at the Department of Defense.

Awards 

On July 12, 2005, Schriver was awarded the Order of the Brilliant Star with Violet Grand Cordon, by then-President of the Republic of China (Taiwan) Chen Shui-bian.

Schriver has been awarded the Department of Defense Medal for Distinguished Public Service, the highest civilian award presented by the U.S. Secretary of Defense.

References

External links

Living people
Trump administration personnel
George W. Bush administration personnel
United States Assistant Secretaries of Defense
Williams College alumni
Stanford University alumni
Harvard Kennedy School alumni
Recipients of the Order of Brilliant Star
1967 births